The men's C-1 1000 metres sprint canoeing competition at the 2014 Asian Games in Hanam was held from 27 to 29 September at the Misari Canoe/Kayak Center.

Schedule
All times are Korea Standard Time (UTC+09:00)

Results

Heats 
 Qualification: 1–3 → Final (QF), Rest → Semifinal (QS)

Heat 1

Heat 2

Semifinal 
 Qualification: 1–3 → Final (QF)

Final

References 

Official website

External links 
Asian Canoe Confederation

Canoeing at the 2014 Asian Games